The R153 road, known as the Kentstown Road, is a regional road in Ireland, located in central County Meath.

References

Regional roads in the Republic of Ireland
Roads in County Meath